is a 2019 action-adventure video game developed by Next Level Games and published by Nintendo for the Nintendo Switch. It is the third main installment in the Luigi's Mansion series following Luigi's Mansion: Dark Moon. The game sees players taking on the role of Luigi who must explore a haunted hotel, incorporating different themes on each floor, and rescue his friends from the ghosts that inhabit it, after the group is tricked into visiting it for a vacation by King Boo.

Alongside a number of returning gameplay elements from the previous installments, the game incorporates new features, including additional moves for ghost catching, an ectoplasmic doppelgänger assistant known as Gooigi, and expanded multiplayer functionality that allows for players to engage in cooperative and competitive gaming both locally and online. The game received positive reviews from critics and was nominated for several awards, winning the award for "Best Family Game" at The Game Awards 2019. The game has sold 12.44 million copies as of December 2022.

Gameplay

Luigi's Mansion 3 is an action-adventure game, in which players control the character of Luigi from a fixed third-person perspective, as they capture ghosts across a large hotel setting. The game features two modes of gameplay – a single-player story mode, and a set of multiplayer game modes – in which ghost catching functions in the same manner as previous installments: players stun ghosts with Luigi's Strobulb, snag them with his Poltergust, and weaken their health down to 0 in order to capture them.

Single-player
In the single-player story mode, players explore a large hotel with 17 floors – each floor consists of a different theme and atmosphere, and a variety of ghosts, including a boss ghost that the player must defeat. Some of the first floors, such as Floor 2, do not have a theme. Unlike the story mode of Luigi's Mansion: Dark Moon, which focused on pre-defined mission structure of gameplay across several mansions, Luigi's Mansion 3 is more open-ended allowing for greater exploration of the game's setting, with the only restriction being that players cannot explore floors in the hotel via the elevator until they have found the button that allows access to it; the hotel's main lobby and basement are the only floors to have a staircase between them that circumvents the need for the elevator.

Treasure can be found during exploration of the hotel's floor from various objects and solving some puzzles. Luigi can find coins (worth 1), banknotes (worth 5), gold bars (worth 10), and pearls (worth 100) as well as bags of money containing many hundreds of coins. He can also find special gems on each floor, alongside the capture of Boos, a regular enemy in the Mario series, while Luigi can find hearts to recover health lost from the attacks of ghosts and other environmental hazards. Some of the features introduced by Dark Moon are available in the game, including a stun charge function that can make ghost catching easier, and the Dark-Light Device, a blacklight function that can reveal objects that have become invisible (after capturing Spirit Balls, which cause the invisibility) and animate certain portraits. It can also bring possessed items, such as possessed chests or rubbish bins, back to normal. New to the series include new functions to the Poltergust – an area burst attack that can help keep multiple enemies back, as well as blow away furniture to reveal treasure; a suction cup attachment, which allows the player to fire a plunger onto obstacles and then remove them by using the Poltergust on the cup's cord; and a slam attack, which allow players to repeatedly smash ghosts they are capturing to the ground, both for greater damage as well as a weapon to hit other ghosts around them.

The most notable addition to the game is Gooigi – an ectoplasmic doppelgänger of Luigi previously introduced in the 3DS remake of the original Luigi's Mansion. Gooigi can conduct similar moves to those of his real counterpart, and can be controlled by the player (switching between Luigi and Gooigi) or a second player in local co-op. Gooigi can be used by the player to help in battles and with solving some of the game's puzzles, some of which require the use of Gooigi and Luigi to complete. Unlike Luigi, Gooigi can squeeze through gaps in vents and grills, and walk across spiked floors, but is weaker than his real counterpart and will instantly lose his physical form if he comes into contact with water or fire.

Multiplayer
The game's multiplayer mode allows for up to eight players to play together locally and online. In this mode, players can engage in cooperative gameplay through "ScareScraper", a returning feature from Dark Moon, or competitive team matches in "ScreamPark". Both modes use the same style of controls in the single-player mode, with players able to control four colour variations (green, purple, orange, or blue) of Luigi or Gooigi. ScareScraper focuses on cooperative team work between players to clear out each of the 5 or 10 floors of a randomly generated high-rise building by seeking out the ghosts hiding on each floor. "ScreamPark" focuses on team-based matches - one side as Team Luigi, the other as Team Gooigi - and scoring points in three different match types: Ghost Hunt, in which teams score points by catching ghosts, with tougher ghosts worth more points; Cannon Barrage, in which teams score points by securing cannonballs, some held by ghosts, loading them into a cannon and firing them at targets, with trickier targets scoring more points; and Coin Floating, in which teams use inflatables to collect coins that drop in a pool, avoiding mines that are dropped as well or lose the coins in their possession and pop the inflatable making them need to blow another one up allowing their opponents to steal them.

Plot
Luigi, his pet ghost dog Polterpup, his brother Mario, Princess Peach and a trio of Toads have been invited to The Last Resort, a luxurious art deco high-rise hotel nestled in a mountainside area, and decide to visit it for a vacation. After arriving and settling in, Luigi wakes up during the night to find the hotel deserted, transformed into a haunted building and the others missing. He discovers that the hotel's ghostly owner, Hellen Gravely, had lured the group to the hotel as part of a trap by King Boo, whom she had freed from Professor E. Gadd's custody after his recapture in the previous game. King Boo announces his plans to exact revenge on Luigi and his friends by imprisoning them in portraits, but Luigi either narrowly escapes to the hotel's lower floors through a laundry chute or gets imprisoned in a portrait by King Boo along with the rest of his friends. With the help of Polterpup, who also avoided capture, Luigi, should he also avoid capture, explores the basement and comes across an old red car in the underground garage carrying a new Poltergust vacuum model. Using it, Luigi follows Polterpup to the lobby and finds that E. Gadd was also captured.

Searching the lobby, Luigi comes across the professor's Dark-Light Device in a safe and uses it to free him. Setting up a portable lab in the garage, E. Gadd explains how he was also tricked into visiting the hotel and captured by Hellen, who had stolen his latest ghost collection from him to staff the building. Believing that Luigi's friends are likely trapped on the upper floors, E. Gadd recommends that Luigi finds the elevator buttons for the upper floors that had been taken from the main elevator after he secures two from a ghost he had defeated earlier. While exploring the floors, each featuring a different theme to them, Luigi is aided further by E. Gadd with two new gadgets: the Virtual Boo, a communication device based on the Virtual Boy, and Gooigi, an ectoplasmic doppelgänger of Luigi. Left with no choice, Luigi begins his search for the missing elevator buttons in order to visit each of the hotel's many floors.

As Luigi makes his search, he comes across and defeats a variety of different ghosts while reclaiming the elevator buttons and rescuing the Toads from their portraits, much to Hellen's anger and frustration. After rescuing the Toads, he reaches the top floor where he confronts Hellen, who he manages to defeat before rescuing Mario. Luigi then follows him to the hotel's roof where they find Peach's portrait. Upon freeing her, the group is confronted by King Boo, having lost faith in Hellen and the ghosts earlier and prepares to imprison them, E. Gadd, and the Toads in a single giant portrait. After being inadvertently saved by Polterpup at the last second, Luigi finds himself forced to defeat King Boo once again, while aided by Gooigi. During the battle, King Boo enlarges the portrait's frame in an attempt to pull in the whole hotel with Luigi still on the roof. Luigi defeats King Boo and manages to recover the portrait moments before the hotel collapses into a ruined mess. After freeing his friends from the portrait, the ghosts Luigi had captured escape from their imprisonment and attempt to attack, but they become social when the jewel from King Boo's crown vanishes, implying that they were all brainwashed. E. Gadd, seeing the ghosts upset over their home's accidental destruction, elects for the group to build a new hotel, while the recaptured King Boo is returned to his custody along with Hellen. Depending on how much money Luigi collected throughout his adventure, the new hotel (built in E. Gadd's version) will be different in size. After the grand reopening, Luigi and his friends depart for home.

Development
Luigi's Mansion 3 is developed by Next Level Games, who previously developed Luigi's Mansion: Dark Moon, and is published by Nintendo. The game was originally planned as a Wii U title, with early prototypes introducing the Slam and Burst as new abilities; however, development started for the Nintendo Switch system in earnest following the completion of Next Level Games' Metroid Prime: Federation Force. The change in setting from a mansion to a hotel was done so that players could have "three-dimensional exploration" with Kensuke Tanabe explaining that they "wanted players to be able to visualize how the hotel was set up". Despite the new setting, the team deliberately made the choice for some of the settings to "make it as unexpected and even un-hotel-like as possible". The team noted that as long as they connected the settings through a traditional hotel setup they could get away with the diverse settings. Some features that were previously present in or planned for the Nintendo 3DS remake of the original Luigi's Mansion were expanded on for the third installment, such as same screen local co-op play and the aforementioned new abilities. Prior to the game's formal announcement, Luigi's new gadget, the Poltergust G-00, was shown for the first time in the August 2018 Super Smash Bros. Ultimate Nintendo Direct as part of the trailer announcing Castlevania content for the game. The Poltergust G-00 was also incorporated into Luigi's moveset, now being able to grab opponents from a distance with the Suction Shot and pull opponents in with it for his Final Smash.

Luigi's Mansion 3 was announced during a Nintendo Direct presentation on September 13, 2018, with the title at the time being listed as tentative and planned for release in 2019. The game was a part of Nintendo's E3 2019 showcase, with a new trailer highlighting the premise, gameplay mechanics, and game modes, including the return of the online multiplayer mode, ScareScraper. A demo was also made available to play on the show floor. Nintendo of America's Nate Bihldorff stated that the game's primary campaign would be longer than that of Dark Moon. He also stated that the finalized title was changed to a simple number "3" rather than a subtitle because the time gap between the second and third installments was much shorter to the point of calling the series an established franchise, as opposed to the 12-year gap between the first and second installments. A new trailer shown during the September 4, 2019 Nintendo Direct showcased some areas of the hotel setting and debuted the ScreamPark, a new party-oriented game mode for up to eight players on a single console. Luigi's Mansion 3 was released on October 31, 2019.

Reception

Luigi's Mansion 3 received generally favourable reviews, according to review aggregator Metacritic. Chelsea Stark of Polygon praised the use of Gooigi, as well as the variety of levels throughout the game, saying that "this is our scaredy-cat hero’s best adventure yet". Ryan McCaffrey at IGN also praised the level design and variety, saying "Luigi's Mansion 3 is so fun, charming, and smartly designed that I hope we get more than three of these every 20 years."

Sales
By December 2022, Luigi's Mansion 3 had sold 12.44 million copies worldwide, making it one of the best-selling games for Nintendo Switch.

Awards

Notes

References

External links 
 

2019 video games
Action-adventure games
BAFTA winners (video games)
Cancelled Wii U games
The Game Awards winners
Interactive Achievement Award winners
Luigi video games
Multiplayer and single-player video games
Next Level Games games
Nintendo Switch games
Nintendo Switch-only games
Video game sequels
Video games about ghosts
Video games developed in Canada
Video games with downloadable content
Video games set in hotels
Video games produced by Kensuke Tanabe
Works about vacationing